The Middle Fork River is a  tributary of the Tygart Valley River in north-central West Virginia, USA. According to the Geographic Names Information System, the Middle Fork River has also been known simply as "Middle Fork" and as "Middlefork."

Geography
Kittle Creek rises on the western slope of Rich Mountain, considered to be part of the westernmost ridge of the Allegheny Mountains and the eastern boundary of the Allegheny Plateau.

From Adolph, the Middle Fork River flows generally northwardly, roughly in parallel to Rich Mountain. Near its mouth it passes through Audra State Park, which was established in the mid-20th century and provides campsites and a swimming beach along the river. In Upshur County it collects a tributary known as the Right Fork Middle Fork River, which rises in southwestern Randolph County and flows northwardly into eastern Upshur County.

For most of its course, the Middle Fork forms whitewater rapids of Class I to Class IV on the International Scale of River Difficulty.  From Audra State Park downstream to its mouth, it forms Class IV rapids.  According to the West Virginia Department of Environmental Protection, approximately 94% of the Middle Fork River's watershed is forested, mostly deciduous, and approximately 4% is used for  agriculture and pasture.

Flow rate
At the United States Geological Survey's stream gauge in Audra State Park, the annual mean flow of the river between 1942 and 2005 was 356 ft³/s (10 m³/s).  The highest recorded flow during the period was 16,700 ft³/s (473 m³/s) on May 17, 1996.  The lowest recorded flow was 0.2 ft³/s (0 m³/s) on several days in October 1953.

See also
List of West Virginia rivers

References

Rivers of West Virginia
Tributaries of the Monongahela River
Rivers of Randolph County, West Virginia
Rivers of Upshur County, West Virginia
Rivers of Barbour County, West Virginia
Allegheny Mountains
Allegheny Plateau